is a professional wrestling video game for the PlayStation 2. It is the sequel to Yuke's Wrestle Kingdom.
 
There are three different game modes as well as a create a wrestler option and a variety of unlockables. Wrestle Kingdom 2 features licensed wrestlers for New Japan Pro-Wrestling and All Japan Pro Wrestling, as well as a number of freelance workers and legends, but differs from the first installment by not including characters from Pro Wrestling Noah.

Gameplay
Wrestle Kingdom 2 features three separate modes for game play. Unlike the previous game, there is no drama mode nor anything that resembles a story or season mode.

Exhibition Matches
For instant action the player can select a variety of different matches. The types of matches include Single Match, Tag Match, Three Way Match, Handicap Match, Four Way Match, Five on Five Team Battle, and Gauntlet. The four preset match types are Normal, Hardcore, Shoot Rules, and MMA Rules. The match rules can be altered to make other types of matches, for instance turning off all match finishes but submission creates a submission match, but the match style does not vary. There are no cage matches or other similar matches that involve more alterations than just changing the rules of a normal match. By winning singles matches with certain wrestlers, video interviews are unlocked.

Tournaments
Select a wrestler and then compete in a tournament for a championship. Winning a championship with certain wrestlers unlocks hidden wrestlers. The championships available are the IWGP Heavyweight Championship at the G1 Climax, the IWGP Junior Heavyweight Championship at Best of the Super Juniors, the Triple Crown Heavyweight Championship at Champion Carnival, and the World Junior Heavyweight Championship at the Super J-Cup.

Campaign Mode
In this mode the player must select a specific wrestling event and then prepare a stable of wrestlers to compete against the computer. At the events matches are put together and then wagers are made for power-ups and unlockables such as wrestlers, moves, and items. The type of match is determined based on the event selected. There are a large number of locations and events in this mode and more appear as the player progresses.

Extras
Wrestle Kingdom 2 features a variety of extra material. The bios include character stats, championship history, and in some cases digital autographs. The interviews available are with Gedo, Genichiro Tenryu, Hiroshi Tanahashi, Jado, Jyushin Thunder Liger, Kaz Hayashi, Keiji Mutoh, Kensuke Sasaki, Koji Kanemoto, Manabu Nakanishi, Masahiro Chono, Minoru, Satoshi Kojima, Shinsuke Nakamura, Taiyō Kea, Tatsumi Fujinami, Tiger Mask, Toshiaki Kawada, Wataru Inoue, Yoshihiro Takayama, and Yuji Nagata.

Roster

New Japan Pro-Wrestling
Masahiro Chono
Shinsuke Nakamura
Hiroshi Tanahashi
Hiroyoshi Tenzan
Yuji Nagata
Manabu Nakanishi
Jyushin Thunder Liger
Tiger Mask
Koji Kanemoto
Minoru Tanaka
Jado
Gedo
Giant Bernard 
Wataru Inoue
Riki Choshu
Ryusuke Taguchi
Naofumi Yamamoto

All Japan Pro Wrestling
Keiji Mutoh
Great Muta
Kaz Hayashi
Satoshi Kojima
Taiyo Kea
Taka Michinoku
Nosawa Rongai
Taru
Shuji Kondo
Brother Yasshi
Masanobu Fuchi
Suwama

Legends
Antonio Inoki
Abdullah The Butcher
Shinya Hashimoto
Tiger Mask (Original)
Terry Funk
Dory Funk Jr.
Jumbo Tsuruta
Stan Hansen
Tiger Jeet Singh
The Sheik
Masakatsu Funaki
Atsushi Onita
Akira Maeda
The Destroyer
Dick Murdoch
"Dr. Death" Steve Williams
Terry Gordy
Big Van Vader

Freelance
Kensuke Sasaki
Yoshihiro Takayama
Toshiaki Kawada
Tajiri
Hayabusa (wrestler)
Tatsumi Fujinami
Akebono
Katsuhiko Nakajima
Osamu Nishimura
Kazunari Murakami
Milano Collection A.T.
Yoshiaki Fujiwara
Genichiro Tenryu

EX
Antonio Inoki (Young) (Hidden)
Keiji Mutoh (Young) (Hidden)
Great Muta (Young) (Hidden)
Great Muta (Hidden)
Masahiro Chono (Young) (Hidden)
Masahiro Chono (20 YEARS Anniversary) (Hidden)
Jyushin Thunder Liger (Young) (Hidden)
Shinsuke Nakamura (Young) (Hidden)
Masked Devilock (Hidden)
Akira Hokuto

See also

Wrestle Kingdom

References

External links
Official website 

2007 video games
All Japan Pro Wrestling
Japan-exclusive video games
New Japan Pro-Wrestling
PlayStation 2 games
PlayStation 2-only games
Professional wrestling games
Video games developed in Japan
Yuke's games
Multiplayer and single-player video games